Med dej i mina armar is a 1940 Swedish comedy film directed by Hasse Ekman.

Plot summary
Krister Dahl loses his memory when he is hit in the head by a golf ball one day. He later goes to a party and meets his ex-wife and immediately fall in love with her again, not knowing who she is. She does not know what to think about this sudden change in his behaviour. He is like new man, only question is, who is he?

Cast
Edvin Adolphson as Krister Dahl
Karin Ekelund as Barbro Brandt
Thor Modéen as Vårby, Kristers valet
Stig Järrel as Felix Tallgren
Katie Rolfsen as Hilda, Barbros maid
Marianne Aminoff as Magdalena Hildisan
Carl-Gunnar Wingård as Svanberg, Lawyer 
Anna-Lisa Baude as Mrs. Svensson 
John Botvid as Alexander Danielsson, taxi driver
Leif Amble-Næss as Sardini
Mimi Pollak as Miss Carlander
Eivor Engelbrektsson as Miss Svensson
Nils Jacobsson as Troubador Höglund 
Åke Johansson as caddie
Julia Cæsar as Krister's Second Secretary 
Emil Fjellström as Coachman
Anna-Lisa Ryding as Connie Löfberg
Ilse-Nore Tromm as Estern
Sven-Olof Sandberg as Courtyard Singer

External links

1940 films
Films directed by Hasse Ekman
1940s Swedish-language films
Swedish romantic comedy films
1940 romantic comedy films
Swedish black-and-white films
1940s Swedish films